The Blood Rose (/ translation: The Flayed Rose) is a 1970 French horror film directed and co-written by Claude Mulot. The French title translates as "The Flayed Rose". 
The film involves a portraitist named Frederick Lansac (Philippe Lemaire) wanting to restore his wife Anne's (Anny Duperey) face to its former beauty after it was disfigured in an accident. Lansac tries to force a surgeon named Rohmer (Howard Vernon) to perform a transplant on her.

Plot
Frederick Lansac is a botanist and portraitist who runs a beauty salon. Lansac meets and falls in love with Anne at a dress ball and the two get married. The two move into Lansac's home but at one of Lansac's portrait exhibitions, Anne's face is pushed into a bonfire by a jealous woman which horribly scars Anne's face. Anne isolates herself in her home where she slowly becomes less mentally stable as well as having erotic dreams about her nurse Agnès. Lansac learns that one of his clients, Dr. Rohmer is a former plastic surgeon who has halted from practising medicine and currently only performs plastic surgery on criminals. Lansac blackmails Rohmer into performing a grafting surgery on his wife to restore her former beauty. Lansac tricks two of his female clients to his home to become the donors for his wife's new face but the two die in the process. Barbara (Élizabeth Teissier), the sister of Anne's former nurse comes to the chateau to look for her sibling, but finds Anne who demands to have her face. Barbara manages to escape and Rohmer commits suicide. Realizing how far his wife has grown into madness, Lansac has his wife killed by his servants and then gives himself up to the police.

Production
The film was shot between May 8, 1969 and June 2, 1969. The film is one of the many unofficial remakes of the film Eyes Without a Face. Other unofficial remakes include The Awful Dr. Orloff and Corruption.

Release
The Blood Rose opened in France on September 25, 1970. The film was shown in the United States in Detroit on October 28, 1970. The film had scenes involving lesbianism that were cut for its American theatrical release.

Contemporary advertisements hailed it as "The First Sex-Horror Film Ever Made."

The film was released on DVD by Mondo Macabro in 2007.

Notes

References

External links
 

1970 horror films
French horror films
1970 films
1970s French-language films
Erotic horror films
1970s French films